This season is TSW Pegasus FC's 4th season in First Division League. They will compete in the First Division League, Senior Shield, FA Cup, and League Cup.

Player

First Team Squad 
As of 18 September 2011.

On Loan

Fixtures and results

Pre-season friendly

Hong Kong First Division League

Directors and staffs

Directors

Staffs

References 

TSW Pegasus FC seasons